Al-Sinaa Sport club is a football club based in Thawra District, East Districts of the Tigris River, Baghdad, that plays in Iraqi Premier League.

History

Premier League Play Overview
Al-Sinaa started playing in the Iraqi Premier League since the start of the championship in the 1974–75 season, and lasted for 23 consecutive seasons, before being relegated to the Iraq Division One in the 1997–98 season, but the team returned to play in the Premier League in the 2001–02 season, and in the 2010–11 season they got third place in the league, but was relegated to the Iraq Division One again in the 2012–13 season, then returned in the 2015–16 season, but was relegated from the league in the same season after it fell to the bottom of the standings in its group.

2020–21 season
After qualifying for the preliminary round, Al-Sinaa played in the 2020-21 Iraq Division One, 13 matches without losing, winning 11, drawing 2, gaining 35 points and taking first place in Group 2, and qualified for the Iraqi Premier League, led by coach Sadeq Hanoon. In the final match, the team beat Newroz 1–0 to become the champion of the Iraq Division One.

Current squad

First-team squad

Current technical staff

{| class="toccolours"
!bgcolor=silver|Position
!bgcolor=silver|Name
!bgcolor=silver|Nationality
|- bgcolor=#eeeeee
| Head coach:||Sadeq Hanoon||
|- 
| Assistant coach:||Sameeh Sabeeh||
|- bgcolor=#eeeeee
| Assistant coach:||Talib Freeh||
|- bgcolor=#eeeeee
| Goalkeeping coach:||Dhiaa Jabbar||
|-
| Team manager:||Mohammed Hadi||
|-

Managerial history
  Qusay Munir 
  Sadeq Hanoon

Honours

Domestic
Iraq Division One (second tier)
Winners (1): 2020–21
Iraq FA Cup
Winners (1): 1983–84

References

External links
 Al-Sinaa SC on Goalzz.com

Sport in Baghdad
1968 establishments in Iraq
Football clubs in Baghdad